Bhadrakali is a locality in Uttarpara Kotrung Municipality of Hooghly district in the Indian state of West Bengal. It is a part of the area covered by Kolkata Metropolitan Development Authority (KMDA).

Geography
Bhadrakali is located on the west bank of the Hooghly River.

Industry
The Bhadrakali distillery of United Spirits was earlier owned by Shaw Wallace. In 1959 Bengal Distillery at Bhadrakali had become a fully owned subsidiary of Shaw Wallace. The Bhadrakali distillery was set up in 1949 and manufactures fast moving brands of Indian-made foreign liquor.

Transport
State Highway 6 (West Bengal) / Grand Trunk Road passes through Bhadrakali. The town is well connected with Howrah–Bardhaman main line through Uttarpara and Hindmotor railway stations.

Education
Swami Niswambalananda Girls' College, a general degree college for girls, was established at Bhadrakali in 1978. It is affiliated to the University of Calcutta and offers honours courses in Bengali, English, Sanskrit, philosophy, history, education, political science, geography and accountancy.

Bhadrakali High School is a Bengali-medium school at Bhadrakali.

Healthcare
There is a primary health centre with 5 beds at Bhadrakali, run by Uttarpara Kotrung Municipality.

References	

Cities and towns in Hooghly district
Neighbourhoods in Kolkata
Kolkata Metropolitan Area